Piotr Łukasik (born 11 July 1994) is a Polish professional volleyball player. The 2020–21 CEV Champions League winner, and a bronze medallist at the 2019 Nations League. At the professional club level, he plays for Cerrad Enea Czarni Radom.

Honours

Clubs
 CEV Champions League
  2020/2021 – with ZAKSA Kędzierzyn-Koźle
 National championships
 2019/2020  Polish SuperCup, with ZAKSA Kędzierzyn-Koźle
 2020/2021  Polish SuperCup, with ZAKSA Kędzierzyn-Koźle
 2020/2021  Polish Cup, with ZAKSA Kędzierzyn-Koźle

References

External links
 
 Player profile at PlusLiga.pl 
 Player profile at Volleybox.net

1994 births
Living people
People from Ostróda
Polish men's volleyball players
AZS Olsztyn players
BBTS Bielsko-Biała players
Projekt Warsaw players
ZAKSA Kędzierzyn-Koźle players
Ślepsk Suwałki players
Czarni Radom players
Outside hitters